The nonsense rat, Nicobar Archipelago rat or Miller's Nicobar rat (Rattus burrus) is endemic to the Nicobar Islands in India. It lives on Great Nicobar, Little Nicobar, and Trinket islands. On Car Nicobar Island, Rattus palmarum and Rattus anadamanensis live instead.

The species was first described in 1902 by Miller, who placed it in the genus Mus. Today it is classified in the genus Rattus. The origin of the name "nonsense rat" is uncertain, as Miller did not provide a common name in his original description. More recent sources, such as the IUCN, include it.

Habitat and distribution
The nonsense rat is endemic to the Nicobar Islands, where it is confined to isolated populations on the islands of Great Nicobar, Little Nicobar and Trinket. It inhabits tropical evergreen and semi-evergreen forests.

Conservation
The nonsense rat is classified as endangered by the IUCN.

References

Rattus
Rats of Asia
Endemic fauna of the Nicobar Islands
Rodents of India
Endangered fauna of Asia
Mammals described in 1902